In mathematics, a linear operator  is called locally finite if the space  is the union of a family of finite-dimensional -invariant subspaces.

 
 
 Each  is finite-dimensional.

An equivalent condition only requires  to be the spanned by finite-dimensional -invariant subspaces.

Examples
 Every linear operator on a finite-dimensional space is trivially locally finite.

References

Abstract algebra
Functions and mappings
Linear algebra
Transformation (function)